Marsh Lane village is located in the civil parish of Eckington in North-East Derbyshire, England. It is 6 miles north east of Chesterfield. In 2011 the village had a population of 895.

Schools

Marsh Lane has a primary school which was built in the 1870s. It also has a nursery for children aged 3–4 years of age.

Culture

As the village is located just between the border of South Yorkshire and Derbyshire, it has its own accent. A cross between the Sheffield (as opposed to Yorkshire) and Chesterfield accents, Chesterfield being the predominant.

References

External links

Villages in Derbyshire
Eckington, Derbyshire